Balchik is a Black Sea coastal town and seaside resort in the Southern Dobruja area of northeastern Bulgaria. It is in Dobrich Province, 35 km southeast of Dobrich and 42 km northeast of Varna. It sprawls scenically along hilly terraces descending from the Dobruja plateau to the sea, and is often called "The White City" because of its white hills.

Etymology
Balchik is named after the medieval ruler Balik, brother of Dobrotitsa, after whom the city of Dobrich is named.

History 

Founded as a Thracian settlement, it was later colonised by the Ionian ancient Greeks with the name Krounoi (renamed as Dionysopolis, after the discovery of a statue of Dionysus in the sea). Later became a Greek-Byzantine and Bulgarian fortress. Under the Ottoman Empire, the town came to be known with its present name, which perhaps derived from a Gagauz word meaning "small town". Another opinion is that its actual name derived from that of a local noble - Balik.

Karvuna is the old Bulgarian name of the ancient Dionysopol (now Balchik). The external resemblance to the name of the modern town of Kavarna is an occasion for some local historians to identify them, but the archeological and historical data are not in favor of this statement. Karvuna was the capital of the Karvuna region - so called Dobrogea in the Middle Ages until the arrival of the Turks. The remains of the castle of the boyars Balik and Dobrotitsa were found above the city hospital of Balchik in the "Horizon" district (Gemidzhiya), but were almost erased by natural processes. In the Vasil Levski neighborhood there are remains of the great fortress of Karvuna, built by the Byzantines and used by them and by the Bulgarians during the First Bulgarian Kingdom. Later, due to the difficulties in defending the vast fortress located in the plain and the lack of a view of the sea, the Bulgarians built a citadel, from which are preserved modest remains of the highest hill in the city - "Echo" (Jenny Bair), and the boyar Balik inhabits the said castle opposite it on the hill above the present hospital, south of the great fortress, which the centuries have now completely obliterated. Dobrotitsa, after ruling for some time here, moved the capital of the Karvun despotate from Karvuna to Kaliakra.

After the liberation of Bulgaria in 1878, Balchik developed as centre of a rich agricultural region, wheat-exporting port, and district (okoliya) town, and later, as a major tourist destination with the beachfront resort of Albena to its south.

After the Second Balkan War, in 1913, the town was renamed Balcic and became part of the Kingdom of Romania. It was regained by Bulgaria during World War I (1916–1919), but Romania restored its authority when hostilities in the region ceased. In 1940, just before the outbreak of World War II in the region, Balchik was ceded by Romania to Bulgaria by the terms of the Craiova Treaty.

During Romania's administration, the Balchik Palace was the favourite summer residence of Queen Marie of Romania and her immediate family. The town is the site of Marie's Oriental villa, the place where her heart was kept, in accordance with her last wishes, until 1940 (when the Treaty of Craiova awarded the region back to Bulgaria). It was then moved to Bran Castle, in central Romania. Today, the Balchik Palace and the adjacent Balchik Botanical Garden are the town's most popular landmarks and a popular tourist sightseeing destination.

During the inter-war period, Balchik was also a favorite destination for Romanian avant-garde painters, lending his name to an informal school of post-impressionist painters – the Balcic School of Painting - which is central in the development of Romanian 20th-century painting. Many works of the artists composing the group depict the town's houses and the Turkish inhabitants, as well as the sea.

Population 
The city's population is 11,051 people (data from National Statistics Institute - Bulgaria, 2018). The total population of Balchik municipality is 19,331.

According to an estimate by Bulgarian historian Rayna Gavrilova the Bulgarian population before 1878 was only around 10%.

The ethnic composition has gradually changed from mostly Gagauz and Tatar/Turkish to predominantly Bulgarian. According to the latest 2011 census data, Balchik's ethnic composition is the following:

Bulgarians: 7,916 (72.9%)
Turks: 1,715 (15.8%)
Gypsies: 954 (8.8%)
Others: 191 (1.8%)
Indefinable: 79 (0.7%)
Undeclared: 755 (6.5%)

Culture

Art
Held each year since 1991, "The ProcessSpace Art Festival" is an annual international festival of Contemporary Art, which takes place over two weeks in June. Balchik Palace also hosts In the Palace International Short Film Festival.

Music
Held annually each summer since 2006 in the nearby town of Kavarna, the Kavarna Rock Fest hosts top-name bands for a three-day festival.  Previous acts have included Motorhead, Twisted Sister, Motley Crew, Scorpions, Alice Cooper, Deep Purple, and the Michael Schenker Group.

Since a few years the mayor has cancelled the  Kavarna Rock Fest due to different music preference.

Sports
Balchik is becoming well known internationally as a golfing destination.  There are three 18-hole championship golf courses within the local vicinity, two designed by Gary Player - Thracian Cliffs GC and BlackSeaRama GC; and one designed by Ian Woosnam - Lighthouse GC.  A fourth 18-hole golf course is currently in the planning stages.

Trivia 
Francis Ford Coppola spent 11 days at the Balchik palace shooting scenes of Youth Without Youth.
Balchik Ridge, in Antarctica, is named after the town.
 The currently unused Balchik Airfield is envisaged to be prepared for low-cost airlines, especially from Russia.
Famous Turkish poet Nazım Hikmet wrote his well-known poem "Mavi Liman" (The Blue Port) in Balchik.

Twin towns - sister cities

Balchik is twinned with:

 Boxberg, Germany
 Bran, Romania
 Cieszyn, Poland
 Galich, Russia
 Hagfors, Sweden  
 Mangalia, Romania
 Stará Ľubovňa, Slovakia
 Tambov, Russia
 Valašské Meziříčí, Czech Republic

Gallery

See also

 Decree of Dionysopolis
 Balchik Palace
 Balchik airport
 Albena
 Bulgarian Black Sea Coast
 Dobrich Province
 Caucasus Cable System
 Turgut Reis Mosque (Balchik)
 Tatar quarter

Notes

References

External links
Balchik.com – Hotels, Restaurants, News, Events and Properties
– Online catalog of Balchik
Balchik Photos
Ancient coinage from Dionysopolis
 Searchable Greek Inscriptions at The Packard Humanities Institute (PHI)  – Segment from Decree of Dionysopolis reviewed in Inscriptiones graecae in Bulgaria repertae by Georgi Mihailov
Quiet Nest Palace
International Art Forum – WithoutBorders
In The Palace International Short Film Festival, Balchik
BulgariaLeisure.com, Tourism Information Portal (in Bulgarian and English)

 
Seaside resorts in Bulgaria
Populated places in Dobrich Province
Former capitals of Bulgaria
Port cities and towns in Bulgaria
Populated coastal places in Bulgaria
Greek colonies on the Black Sea coast
Port cities of the Black Sea
Place names of Turkish origin in Bulgaria